Joan Solano Bustamante (born 5 May 1953) is a Spanish rower. He competed in the men's quadruple sculls event at the 1980 Summer Olympics.

References

1953 births
Living people
Spanish male rowers
Olympic rowers of Spain
Rowers at the 1980 Summer Olympics
Place of birth missing (living people)